John Mark Davidson (born February 15, 1961), is a former professional baseball player who played outfielder in the Major Leagues from 1986–1991. He played for the Minnesota Twins and Houston Astros.

Davidson graduated in 1978 from Garinger High School in Charlotte, North Carolina. He played baseball for the UNC Charlotte in 1979 and 1980, and then transferred to Clemson University, where he played in 1982. He was drafted by the Twins in the 11th round of the 1982 amateur draft. In 1987, he played in 102 games and had a .267 batting average. He was a member of the Twins team that won the 1987 World Series. He currently lives in Seneca, South Carolina.

Davidson's son, Logan, is also a professional baseball player.

References

External links
, or Retrosheet
Pura Pelota (Venezuelan Winter League)

1961 births
Living people
Baseball players from Knoxville, Tennessee
Charlotte 49ers baseball players
Charlotte Knights players
Clemson Tigers baseball players
Clemson University alumni
Colorado Springs Sky Sox players
Houston Astros players
Major League Baseball left fielders
Major League Baseball right fielders
Minnesota Twins players
Orlando Twins players
Portland Beavers players
Tigres de Aragua players
American expatriate baseball players in Venezuela
Toledo Mud Hens players
Tucson Toros players
University of North Carolina at Charlotte alumni
Wisconsin Rapids Twins players